The Army Air Forces in World War II is a seven-volume work describing the actions of the U.S. Army Air Corps (from June 1941, the U.S. Army Air Forces) between January 1939 and August 1945. It was published between 1948 and 1958 by the University of Chicago Press under the auspices of the Office of Air Force History.  The series editors were Wesley Frank Craven and James Lea Cate.

Background
In June 1942, the Chief of the Air Staff directed that an historian be appointed to record the military operations of the Air Corps. In July a similar position was created to provide an administrative history.  Both efforts were placed in the Historical Division of the Office of the Assistant Chief of Air Staff, Intelligence.  The officer in charge, Col. Clanton W. Williams of the University of Alabama, held a succession of titles which culminated in AAF Historian.  Editors Craven and Cate equate his duties to those of a university dean.

Col. Williams directed the recruitment and placement of historians in the Air Staff and at unit headquarters worldwide.  The Air Staff and he determined that "... the job should be entrusted only to professionally qualified personnel [who would] have full access to all [Army Air Forces] records necessary ...". Most were not professional military men but academics who were already serving in the Air Forces. Of necessity, their focus during the war was "selection and collection of materials" though they were often involved in producing action reports and unit history monographs. The Historical Office determined that the final effort "should be scholarly in tone [and] should be addressed to those readers who have a serious interest in the study of the air war ...". The Office decided that the seven-volume format listed below was both necessary and appropriate for a thorough treatment of the subject.

Post-war
After V-J Day the Historical Office was moved from Intelligence to be a special staff office.  The Office approached Wesley Craven and James Cate to oversee the history project. Craven, then a Lieutenant Colonel in the Army Air Forces, was on leave from the faculty of New York University. Cate, then a Major, had come to the Army Air Forces from the University of Chicago. They agreed on the condition that they would be given a free hand in editorial decisions and access to all pertinent materials, a requirement which they state "has been lived up to in letter and in spirit". The University of Chicago agreed with similar conditions to sponsor and publish the work.

The seven volumes are in effect a collection of essays. Craven and Cate recruited 32 authors to write chapters or whole sections and also wrote several chapters themselves. Most of the authors had served in the AAF during the war and had returned to their college and university faculties after it. A few were professional officers with academic training.  Craven and Cate note that "they have written as present scholars rather than as former Air Corps officers".

Though the series has the appearance of an official history, editors Wesley Craven and James Cate emphasize that is "not an official report in the ordinary sense of that term – one to which the Air Staff necessarily subscribes in all its details and final conclusions".

Contents
The seven volumes and their publication dates are:
 
 
 
 
 
 
 

A companion volume, Combat Chronology 1941-1945,  was compiled by Kit C. Carter and Robert Mueller and jointly published in 1973 by the Albert F. Simpson Historical Research Center of the Air University and the Office of Air Force History, Headquarters USAF.

References

Further reading

External links 
 HyperWar: U.S. Army Air Force in World War II – transcribed version

United States Army Air Forces
20th-century history books
Series of history books about World War II
Book series introduced in 1948
Non-fiction books about military history of the United States
Official military history books